The Ginetta F400, previously known as the Farbio GTS, and originally developed by Arash Motor Company as the Farboud GTS, was a sports car produced by the British car manufacturer Ginetta Cars. It was the first car planned for production by Farbio Sports Cars until the rights of the car were sold to Ginetta in 2010.

Farbio GTS/Farboud GT

The Farbio GTS was originally conceived in 2002 as the Farboud GT with a twin-turbocharged Audi V6 engine from the Audi RS4.  The GTS was unveiled at the 2004 British International Motorshow featuring the Audi engine, developing 440 bhp.

Arash sold the rights of the car to the newly established Farbio Sports cars which eventually launched the car as the Farbio GTS in 2007 with sales commencing from the beginning of 2008.

Three engine options were offered, with the GTS 260, 350 and 400. Both the GTS 350 and 400 featured a supercharged 3.0-litre Ford V6 engine derived from the Ford V6 Mustang. The base GTS 260 model with  engine could accelerate to 97 km/h in 4.8 seconds.

F400
When Ginetta acquired the rights of the car in 2010, very little was altered from the original Farbio GTS, except the addition of a new supercharger to the Ford V6 engine. Standard features for the F400 included adjustable black leather interior, leather trimmed dashboard, power-assisted sports steering, a Kenwood audio system and air conditioning. Other bespoke options included interior carpeting, coloured headliners, carbon fibre racing bucket seats trimmed in leather with four-point racing harness, carbon fibre steering wheel, coloured door inserts and an alcantara interior trim.

The F400 came with special 19-inch forged alloy wheels in gloss black or silver finish. Added exterior options included bespoke specialist paint, bare carbon doors, brake callipers painted in red colour and heated front windshield.

Although these figures were never tested.

The F400 was sold in limited numbers at a price of £95,000 (US$154,770) when production was halted in 2010 and the car underwent significant redevelopment to be relaunched at the end of 2011 as the Ginetta G60.

References

External links

F400
Rear mid-engine, rear-wheel-drive vehicles
Sports cars
Cars introduced in 2007
2010s cars